The Capital Area Council of Governments (CAPCOG) is a voluntary association of cities, counties and special districts in Central Texas.

Based in Austin, the Capital Area Council of Governments is a member of the Texas Association of Regional Councils.

Counties served
Bastrop
Blanco
Burnet
Caldwell
Fayette
Hays
Lee
Llano
Travis
Williamson

Largest cities in the region
Austin
Round Rock
San Marcos
Cedar Park
Georgetown
Pflugerville
Taylor
Lockhart
Kyle
Leander

References

External links
Capital Area Council of Governments - Official site.

Texas Association of Regional Councils